The grey commissure is a thin strip of grey matter that surrounds the central canal of the spinal cord and, along with the anterior white commissure, connects the two halves of the cord. It comprises lamina X in the Rexed classification.

External links
 

Spinal cord